Francis John Haverfield,  (8 November 1860 at Shipston-on-Stour – 1 October 1919) was an English ancient historian, archaeologist, and academic. From 1907 to 1919 he held the Camden Professorship of Ancient History at the University of Oxford.

Education

Educated at Winchester College and New College, University of Oxford. At Oxford he gained a First in Classical Moderations in 1880 and a Second in Literae Humaniores ('Greats', a combination of philosophy and ancient history) in 1883. He worked for a time under Theodor Mommsen. He won the Conington Prize at Oxford in 1891 and in the following year was appointed a Student [Fellow] of Christ Church, Oxford. In 1907 he moved to Brasenose College to become Camden Professor of Ancient History.

Work

Haverfield was the first to undertake a scientific study of Roman Britain and is considered by some to be the first theorist to tackle the issue of the Romanization of the Roman Empire. Some consider him the innovator of the discipline of Romano-British archaeology. His works include The Romanization of Roman Britain (1905) (which originated as a lecture to the British Academy and for which he is best known), Ancient Town Planning (1913), and The Roman Occupation of Britain (1924), many monographs, and the authoritative chapters he contributed to the Victoria History of the Counties of England. He excavated the Roman fort at Hardknott, the site of ancient Mediobogdum in Cumbria. He collected and published known Latin inscriptions in Britain.

He gave the Rhind Lectures in 1905 and 1907, on Roman Britain.

Haverfield is credited as playing a prominent role in creation of both the Society for the Promotion of Roman Studies and the British School at Rome.

He was on the governing body of Abingdon School from 1907 to 1919 and was a supporter of the school.

Legacy

Among his other substantial contributions to education, Haverfield bequeathed his papers and impressive library to the university, these were subsequently housed at the Ashmolean Museum. In 2001, Haverfield's material was transferred to the newly-built Sackler Library, and is now found in the Haverfield Archive section to the right hand side of the ground floor library. This archive consists of correspondence, coloured prints, and drawings illustrating mosaic pavements, site plans, publication extracts, although, this reportedly represents only a small fraction of Haverfield's papers. In addition, the archive holds valuable resources from European continental journals such as Romanobarbarica, including historical sources that Haverfield knew of and used in his work.

Students

Among his students was the archaeologist and topographer Thomas Ashby (1874–1931), the first scholar and third director of the British School at Rome, the Oxford historian, archaeologist, and philosopher R. G. Collingwood (1889–1943) and the archaeologist and anthropologist John Garstang (1876–1956).

References

External links

 
 
 List of Papers of Francis J. Haverfield
 George Macdonald, "Haverfield, Francis John (1860–1919)," rev. P. W. M. Freeman, Oxford Dictionary of National Biography first published 2004; online edn, May 2010, 975 words 

1860 births
1919 deaths
English archaeologists
English classical scholars
Fellows of Brasenose College, Oxford
20th-century archaeologists
20th-century English historians
Classical scholars of the University of Oxford
Historians of antiquity
People educated at Winchester College
Camden Professors of Ancient History
Fellows of the British Academy
Governors of Abingdon School
People of the Royal Commission on the Historical Monuments of England
Presidents of The Roman Society